Joakim Alexander Lundell (unmarried Berg, ; born 9 October 1985), previously known as Jockiboi, is a Swedish YouTuber, reality contestant, musician and author.

Career
Lundell became known in Sweden after participating in the Kanal 5 reality series "Kungarna av Tylösand" in 2010. He has won several "Guldtuben" awards for his work on YouTube and with his blog, In 2015 he won the "Star of the year" award and in 2016 he won the "Hidden camera of the year" award at the same gala. Lundell's wedding was the subject of a reality TV-series called Jocke och Jonna i nöd och lust, broadcast on TV3-Play and TV3, that showed the couple's preparations for their wedding. In 2017, the Lundells appeared in their own reality series called Jocke och Jonna möter which was broadcast on Viafree. In 2017, Lundell published his autobiography, entitled Monster. In 2018, he released the music single "Hazardous" along with Lazee, which peaked at number five on the Swedish Singles Chart. In 2018, he also released his first album, "Feelings". On 14 February 2020, Lundell released the single "Under Water" with Swedish singer-songwriter "Dotter". A music video for the song was released on 13 February 2020.

In 2020, he entered Big Brother Sverige on Day 22. According to Swedish newspaper Aftonbladet, Lundell's entry was "just a prank" and he left the show on 4 March 2020.

Personal life
Lundell met his wife Jonna Lundell in 2013. They got married in 2016, and he took her last name. Lundell has been diagnosed with Asperger syndrome and attention deficit hyperactivity disorder.

Discography

Albums

Singles

Notes

References

1985 births
Living people
Swedish television personalities
People from Vadstena Municipality
Video bloggers
Swedish YouTubers
Swedish male musicians
People with Asperger syndrome